Amphimenoides is a genus of ground beetles in the family Carabidae. There are at least two described species in Amphimenoides.

Species
These two species belong to the genus Amphimenoides:
 Amphimenoides maculatus Kirschenhofer, 1999
 Amphimenoides pearsoni (Andrewes, 1923)

References

Lebiinae